Kaluga is a city in Central Russia.

Kaluga may also refer to:
Kaluga Oblast (created 5 July 1944 as part of the Soviet Union), now a federal subject of Russia
Kaluga Province (1719-1775), Russian Empire 
Kaluga Governorate (1796-1929), Russian Empire
Kaluga, Poland, a village in southern Poland
Kaługa, Kuyavian-Pomeranian Voivodeship, a village in north-central Poland
Kaluga, Oryol Oblast, a village in Oryol Oblast, Russia
Kaluga-Solovyovka, a village (selo) in Chelyabinsk Oblast, Russia
Kaluga (fish), a sturgeon found in the Amur River basin
 FC Kaluga, football club from Kaluga
 FC Lokomotiv Kaluga
 FC Turbostroitel Kaluga
 Kaluga crater
 Kaluga Airport

See also
Kaluzhsky (disambiguation)